Great! is the third extended play by South Korean girl group Momoland. It was released by Duble Kick Entertainment and distributed by Kakao M on January 3, 2018. For the extended play, Momoland worked with a variety of producers including Shinsadong Tiger, Monster Factory, Pinkmoon and Beverly Kidz. Great! consists of six tracks including the single "Bboom Bboom" and its instrumental, three other new tracks and the instrumental version of the previously released single "Wonderful Love" (EDM ver.).

To promote the extended play, the group performed on several South Korean music show programs, such as M Countdown and Inkigayo. Commercially, the album peaked at number three on South Korea's Gaon Album Chart.

Commercial performance 
In South Korea, the extended play debuted at number twenty-nine on the Gaon Album Chart for the week ending January 6, 2018. The following week, it dropped to number forty-nine. In its third week, it peaked at number twenty. It was the forty-first most selling album on the Gaon Album Chart for the month of January 2018 with 5,366 copies sold. In February 2018, the extended play peaked of number three, making it the highest-charting album of Momoland on the Gaon Album Chart. It was the fourteenth most selling album on the Gaon Album Chart for the month of February 2018 with 11,920 copies sold. As of April 2018, it has sold over 22,596 copies.

Track listing

Charts

Credits and personnel
Credits adapted from Melon.
 Momoland – vocals 
 ATM – lyricist 
 Beom x Nang – lyricist , composer 
 Beverly Kidz – lyricist , composer , arrangement 
 The Cannels – composer 
 Long Candy – composer 
 Monster Factory – lyricist , composer , arrangement 
 Myo – arrangement 
 Pinkmoon – lyricist , composer , arrangement 
 Shinsadong Tiger – lyricist , composer , arrangement 
 Tenzo & Tasco – composer 
 Yoon Seok – lyricist , composer

Release history

References

Momoland albums
2018 EPs
Korean-language EPs
Kakao M EPs